Sitalcicus incertus is a species of harvestmen in the family Podoctidae. The species is endemic to Silhouette Island of Seychelles.

References

Endemic fauna of Seychelles
Animals described in 1983
Harvestmen